Magit is an interface to the Git version control system
(a Git Client),
implemented as a GNU Emacs package
written in Elisp.
It is made available through the MELPA package repository,
on which it is the most-downloaded non-library package, with over 3.7 million downloads as of February 2023.

Like many graphical user interfaces, Magit provides a visual interface to represent version control actions;
however, it uses a keyboard-centric model, and also functions as a text-based user interface.
The issue of key-memorization is mitigated through use of a popup menu which displays the actions available to the user — serving as a mnemonic aid.

History 

Magit was created by Marius Vollmer in 2008,
with Jonas Bernoulli assuming the role of maintainer in 2013.
Since its release, Magit has seen a high degree of community involvement, with 350 individuals
having contributed code to this free software project as of September 2020.

In 2018 Magit underwent a Kickstarter funding campaign which aimed to fund the maintainer for a year of work. The fundraising was successful and resulted in the project being the 27th most funded software project on Kickstarter. Since the Kickstarter funded period expired donations are encouraged to support the authors development via direct payments, GitHub's sponsorship program and various other crowdfunding services.

Functionality 

Magit aims to encapsulate the entire functionality of Git.
As such, Magit includes interfaces for
 Cloning a repository, and fetching/pulling from it
 Staging, unstaging, and discarding changes in the worktree
 Creating commits and pushing them to a remote
 Creating branches, and either merging or rebasing onto them
 Magit makes use of Emacs' Ediff to provide 3-way-merge functionality
 Browsing and bisecting the commit history
 Creating and applying patches
 Adding notes and tags to commits

Forges 

Magit's Forge provides integration with a number of forges,
namely GitHub and GitLab.

Partial support is also listed for: Gitea, Gogs, Bitbucket, Gitweb, Cgit, StGit and SourceHut.

Forge currently allows for
 Fetching topics and notifications
 Listing topics, issues, pull-requests, notifications, and repositories
 Creating issues, pull-requests (PRs), PR from an issue, PR reviews, and forks

Reception 

There has been interest in including Magit in Emacs, but there are issues with obtaining FSF copyright assignment from all contributors to the project.

Magit is favourably covered in a number of blog posts and tutorials
and a talk delivered by former Emacs' maintainer John Wiegley

Magit is included by default in the Emacs configuration frameworks Spacemacs and Doom Emacs

As of February 2023, Magit is the most starred Emacs package on GitHub.

See also 
 Emacs

Notes

References

External links
 

Emacs
Git (software)